The 1999 Budweiser/G.I. Joe's 200 was the eighth round of the 1999 CART FedEx Champ Car World Series season, held on June 20, 1999, on the Portland International Raceway in Portland, Oregon.

Report

Race 
Searching for his first career win, Hélio Castro-Neves took the lead at the start by going around the outside of polesitter Juan Pablo Montoya in Turn 1. Castro-Neves and Montoya built a gap to the rest of the field and raced on their own in the first stint, with Montoya taking the lead at the first round of pit stops. Castro-Neves stayed with him until an electrical failure slowed him down and ultimately made him retire. This left Montoya with a big lead, but a caution due to Richie Hearn's spin erased it, and Montoya then threw away the lead entirely by spinning at the restart. Gil de Ferran took the lead, but Montoya soon passed him and regained it back, but a slower second pit stop handed the lead back to de Ferran, with Montoya third behind Paul Tracy. Montoya immediately took a second from Tracy, with Dario Franchitti coming up to third. While Montoya, Franchitti, Tracy, and others were conserving fuel, de Ferran went flat out and built up a big enough lead to make a third pit stop for fuel and come out in front of Montoya. He took his first win in three years, with Montoya holding off Franchitti for the second.

Classification

Race

Caution flags

Lap Leaders

Point standings after race

References 

Grand Prix of Portland
1999 in CART